was a Japanese professional sumo wrestler from Taitō, Tokyo. He was the sport's 40th yokozuna, and later a professional wrestler.

Sumo career

He made professional debut in January 1936, joining Takasago stable. He was promoted to the top makuuchi division in May 1943. On the sixth day of the November 1944 tournament, he defeated yokozuna Futabayama, the last wrestler ever to do so as Futabayama pulled out of the tournament the next day and only fought one more bout before his retirement. Azumafuji was promoted to ōzeki in June 1945 on the strength of two runner-up performances. He won his first top division championship in May 1948, and was promoted to the top yokozuna rank in October of that year after finishing as runner-up. Going against historical trends, he managed to win his debut yokozuna tournament, in January 1949.

On the 12th day of the September 1951 tournament, Azumafuji recorded an azukari, or hold, a rare result. On that day, he had come down with acute pneumonia but he forced himself to continue in the tournament as he had only one loss. Azumafuji fought with then ōzeki Yoshibayama twice, but the outcome still could not be determined. After the second bout, Azumafuji could not stand up any more and conceded defeat, but the gentlemanly Yoshibayama insisted that the fairest result was to declare a hold, which was confirmed by the officials. Azumafuji went on to win the tournament, his fourth championship.

Azumafuji won his sixth and final championship in September 1953, and struggled with injuries after that. In September 1954, ōzeki Tochinishiki seemed certain to win his second consecutive championship. Azumafuji suddenly announced his retirement at that tournament, not wishing to hinder Tochinshiki's promotion to yokozuna. Had he remained, Tochinishiki would have become the fifth active yokozuna, an unprecedented situation. Tochinishiki reportedly asked Azumafuji to reconsider his decision, but to no avail.

Professional wrestling career
Azumafuji was the first yokozuna to turn to Western-style professional wrestling, in 1955. This occurred after a dispute in the Japan Sumo Association between two other elders, Takasago and Tatsunami, which he wished to escape. In April 1955 he won the Hawaiian Tag Team title in Honolulu alongside another former sumo wrestler turned professional wrestler, Rikidōzan. In 1956 he defeated former judoka Toshio Yamaguchi to win the Japanese Heavyweight tournament. This tournament was supposed to give him a shot at Rikidozan, at the time the Japanese Heavyweight Champion, but the match never took place.

Championships and accomplishments
 Mid-Pacific Promotions
 NWA Hawaii Tag Team Championship (1 time) - with Rikidōzan

Sumo top division record

From 1953 a New Year tournament was added and the Spring tournament began to be held in Osaka.

  
    
    
    
  
  
    
    
    
  
  
    
    
    
  
  
    
    
    
  
  
    
    
    
  
  
    
    
    
  
  
    
    
    
  
  
    
    
    
  
  
    
    
    
  
  
    
    
    
  

    
    
    
    
  
  
    
    
    
    
  

*d = draw (引分)  /  h = hold (預り)

See also
Glossary of sumo terms
List of past sumo wrestlers
List of sumo tournament top division champions
List of yokozuna

References

External links

 Japan Sumo Association profile
 Article on Azumafuji
 

1921 births
1973 deaths
Japanese sumo wrestlers
Yokozuna
Japanese male professional wrestlers
People from Taitō
Sumo people from Tokyo